opened in Amakusa, Japan, in 1966 and in March 2014 received its four millionth visitor. The museum includes exhibits relating to the Shimabara Rebellion and Kakure kirishitan ('hidden Christians').

See also
 Kirishitan
 Christianity in Japan

References

External links
  Amakusa Christian Museum

Museums in Kumamoto Prefecture
History museums in Japan
Museums established in 1966
1966 establishments in Japan
Christianity in Japan
Christian museums
Religious museums in Japan